The Itarinae are a subfamily of crickets, in the family Gryllidae (subfamily group Gryllinae), based on the type genus Itara.  They are terrestrial and omnivorous and distributed in tropical and subtropical Asia.

Genera 
The Orthoptera Species File lists just two genera:
 Itara Walker, 1869
 Parapentacentrus Shiraki, 1930

References

External links 
 
 Specimens of Itara at the British Museum Natural History.

Orthoptera subfamilies
Ensifera
Crickets
Orthoptera of Asia